Aeotec Group GmbH is a home automation and electronics multinational based in Hamburg, Germany and is known as Aeotec. It had previously been known as Aeon Labs and had been headquartered in Silicon Valley, California. It was founded in 2016.

Its range of products utilizes the Zigbee and Z-Wave communications protocol, the latter being a technology to which Aeotec owns the European rights. The group acquired German electronics maker Popp & Co.,  founded in 1930 and also Z-Wave Europe, a major distributor of IOT and Smart Home products. The acquisitions moved both its headquarters and research-and-development operations to Germany.

Aeotec has partnerships with multiple solutions providers including Alarm.com, ADT, AT&T, Huawei, for whom Aeotec is a core connected home accessory provider, Orange S.A., and Telefónica.

Products

The majority of the company's products have been released under the company's own brand name of Aeotec while operating for many years as an original equipment manufacturer. Aeotec products have been designed to work with controllers such as Matter, Home Assistant, openHab, SmartThings, and Wink along with the group's own controllers AutoPilot and Smart Home Hub.

References

External links 
 Aeotec official website

Manufacturing companies based in Hamburg
Garage door opener manufacturers
Home automation companies
Technology companies of Germany